Abdullah Mohamed Al-Sheib (born 29 June 1965) is a Qatari athlete. He competed in the men's long jump at the 1988 Summer Olympics and the 1992 Summer Olympics.

References

1965 births
Living people
Athletes (track and field) at the 1988 Summer Olympics
Athletes (track and field) at the 1992 Summer Olympics
Qatari male long jumpers
Qatari male high jumpers
Olympic athletes of Qatar
Place of birth missing (living people)
Asian Games medalists in athletics (track and field)
Asian Games bronze medalists for Qatar
Athletes (track and field) at the 1990 Asian Games
Athletes (track and field) at the 1994 Asian Games
Medalists at the 1990 Asian Games